Bogdana is a commune in Teleorman County, Muntenia, Romania. It is composed of four villages: Bogdana, Broșteanca, Ulmeni and Urluiu.

References

Communes in Teleorman County
Localities in Muntenia